Webbe is a surname, and may refer to:

In arts and entertainment
Benji Webbe (born 1967), Welsh singer
Samuel Webbe (1740–1816), English composer
Simon Webbe (born 1978), British musician
William James Webbe (1830–1904), English painter

In government and politics
Anthony Webbe (English politician) (died 1578?), English politician
Claudia Webbe (born 1965), English politician
George Webbe (MP) (by 1509–1556), English politician
Sir Harold Webbe (1885–1965), English politician
Henry Webbe, 14th-century English politician
James Webbe (by 1528–1557), English politician
John Webbe (died 1557), English politician, MP for Dover
John Webbe (died 1571), English politician, MP for Salisbury
Josiah Webbe (1768–1804), East India Company official
William Webbe alias Kellowe (by 1466–1523), MP for Salisbury
William Webbe (by 1499–1554), MP for Salisbury
William Webbe (by 1508–c. 1547), MP for Huntingdon
William Webbe (fl.1542), MP for Warwick
William Webbe (died 1585), MP for Salisbury
William Webbe (mayor) (died 1599), Lord Mayor of London
William Harold Webbe (1885–1965), British politician

In sport
A. J. Webbe (1855–1941), English cricketer
George Webbe (cricketer) (1856–1934), New Zealand cricketer
Glen Webbe (born 1962), Welsh rugby union player
Terrance Webbe (born 1969), West Indian cricketer

In other fields
Joseph Webbe (fl.1610–1630), English grammarian, physician and astrologer

See also
Webb (disambiguation)